The 39th International Emmy Awards took place on November 21, 2011, in New York City, and was hosted by actor Jason Priestley. The award ceremony, presented by the International Academy of Television Arts and Sciences (IATAS), honors all TV programming produced and originally aired outside the United States.

Ceremony 
Nominations for the 39th International Emmy Awards were announced on October 3, 2011, by the International Academy of Television Arts & Sciences (IATAS) at a Press Conference at Mipcom in Cannes. A record number of 20 countries competed for the International Emmys in 2011, they are: Argentina, Australia, Belgium, Brazil, Canada, Chile, China, Colombia, France, Germany, Japan, Malaysia, Mexico, Portugal, Singapore, South Korea, Spain, Sweden, the Philippines and the United Kingdom. Brazil's TV Globo led the nominations for the award, as it did in the last edition.

In addition to the presentation of the International Emmys for programming and performances, the International Academy presented two special awards. Veteran British producer Nigel Lythgoe, co-creator and executive producer of So You Think You Can Dance and executive producer of American Idol, received the Founders Award and Subhash Chandra, Chairman Zee Entertainment Enterprises Ltd, received the Directorate Award.

Winners and nominees

Most major nominations 
By country
 — 7
 — 6

References

External links 
 
 39TH INTERNATIONAL EMMY® AWARDS NOMINEES ANNOUNCED
 LADY GAGA OPENS SHOW BY PRESENTING NIGEL LYTHGOE WITH INTERNATIONAL EMMY® FOUNDERS AWARD

International Emmy Awards ceremonies
2011 television awards
2011 in American television